Galbiate is a comune (municipality) in the Province of Lecco in the Italian region Lombardy, located about  northeast of Milan and about  south of Lecco.

Galbiate borders the following municipalities: Annone di Brianza, Civate, Colle Brianza, Ello, Garlate, Lecco, Malgrate, Oggiono, Olginate, Pescate, Valgreghentino, Valmadrera.

Notable people
Renato Corti (1936–2020), cardinal and prelate of the Catholic Church

References

External links
 Official website

Cities and towns in Lombardy